Mohammad Adeeb (born 5 September 1945) is an Indian politician from Delhi. He has been a former president of Rashtrawadi Samaj Party.

Before being a member of the Rajya Sabha represented the Bahujan Samaj Party. In 2019, he joined Shivpal Yadav's Samajwadi Party along with some Muslim leaders after the alliance of Samajwadi Party and Bahujan Samaj Party.

He graduated from Aligarh Muslim University and recently penned a book titled 'Zindagi Zara Ahista Chal', that sheds lights on the 50-year Muslim politics.

Positions held

References

External links
 Rajyasabha Profile

1945 births
Living people
Bahujan Samaj Party politicians from Uttar Pradesh
Samajwadi Party politicians
Samajwadi Party politicians from Uttar Pradesh
Rajya Sabha members from Uttar Pradesh